Bitterballen (plural of bitterbal) are a Dutch meat-based snack, made by making a very thick stew thickened with roux and beef stock and generously loaded with meat, refrigerating the stew until it firms, and then rolling the thick mixture into balls which then get breaded and fried. Seasonings in the base stew usually include onions, salt and pepper, parsley and nutmeg. Most recipes include nutmeg and there are also variations using curry powder or that add in finely chopped vegetables such as carrot. 

The bitterbal derives its name from a generic word for certain types of herb-flavoured alcoholic beverages, called a bitter in Dutch, and are popularly served as part of a bittergarnituur, a selection of savoury snacks to go with drinks, at pubs or at receptions in the Netherlands.

Bitterballen are very similar to the more common croquette (kroketten in Dutch) in ingredients and preparation/cooking methods, as well as flavour, though the larger kroketten have a distinct oblong sausage shape, but with a similar diameter.

Preparation
The ingredients are combined and cooked, then refrigerated for the mixture to firm up. Once firm, the filling is rolled into balls roughly 3 to 4 cm in diameter, then battered in a breadcrumb and egg mixture and deep-fried. They are typically served with a ramekin or small bowl of mustard for dipping. They are eaten in Suriname, the Netherlands Antilles, the Netherlands, Belgium, Bonaire, and to some degree in Indonesia.

See also
 List of meatball dishes

References

External links
The Dutch Table - Bitterballen

Dutch cuisine
Dutch words and phrases
Beef dishes
Deep fried foods
Snack foods
Meatballs